The Christian Democratic Party (Partai Kristen Demokrat, PKD), is an Indonesian Christian Democratic political party founded in 2005.

The party initiator and founder is Sonny Wuisan (Secretary-General). Their leader also the founder, Tommy Sihotang (Chairman).

External links 
 Partai Kristen Demokrat website

Christian democratic parties in Asia
Political parties established in 2005
Political parties in Indonesia
2005 establishments in Indonesia
Christianity in Indonesia